Watch Hill may refer to:

in England
 Watch Hill (Cockermouth), a 254 m Marilyn and Wainwright Outlying Fell near Cockermouth in the Lake District
 Watch Hill (Whitehaven), a 172 m hill near Whitehaven in the Lake District
 Watch Hill Castle, a medieval fortification in Greater Manchester

in the United States
Watch Hill, New York
Watch Hill, Rhode Island
Watch Hill Light, a lighthouse in Watch Hill, Rhode Island

See also
Watchhill, Cumbria, England
Watchill, Dumfries and Galloway, Scotland